Mileh Sara (also Romanized as Mīleh Sarā) is a village in Howmeh Rural District, in the Central District of Masal County, Gilan Province, Iran. At the 2006 census, its population was 1,032, in 269 families.

References 

Populated places in Masal County